18 Monocerotis is a binary star system located about half way from Orion's Belt to Procyon, in the equatorial constellation of Monoceros. It is visible to the naked eye as a faint, orange-hued star with an apparent visual magnitude of 4.47, and is positioned around 370 light years away from the Sun based on parallax. The system is receding from the Earth with a heliocentric radial velocity of +11 km/s.

The visible component is an aging K-type giant star with a stellar classification of K0+IIIaBa0.2, showing a slight overabundance of barium. The spectrum displays strong violet lines of CN. With the supply of hydrogen at its core exhausted, this star has expanded to 27 times the radius of the Sun. It is radiating 311 times the luminosity of the Sun from its swollen photosphere at an effective temperature of 4,750 K.

References

K-type giants
Monoceros (constellation)
BD+02 1397
Monocerotis, 18
049293
032578
2506
Spectroscopic binaries